The Yorkshire Terrier is a British breed of toy dog of terrier type. It originated in the nineteenth century in the English county of Yorkshire, for which it is named. Their coats are typically tan on the head with a dark steel-grey body, but they can come in a variety of colors.

It is a playful and energetic dog, usually kept as a companion dog. It has contributed to the development of other breeds including the Silky Terrier, and also to cross-breeds such as the Yorkipoo.

History

The Yorkshire Terrier originated in Yorkshire. In the mid-nineteenth century, workers from Scotland came to Yorkshire in search of work and brought with them several varieties of terrier dogs. Breeding of the Yorkshire terrier was "principally accomplished by the people – mostly operatives in cotton and woollen mills – in the counties of Yorkshire and Lancashire."  In the 1800s, miners wanting to develop a ratting terrier, bred Black-and-Tan Terriers with the Paisley and Clydesdale Terriers. Details are scarce. Mrs A. Foster is quoted as saying in 1886, "If we consider that the mill operatives who originated the breed were nearly all ignorant men, unaccustomed to imparting information for public use, we may see some reason why reliable facts have not been easily attained."

The breed originates from two distinct dogs, a male named Old Crab, a female named Kitty, and another female whose name is not known. The Paisley Terrier, a smaller version of the Skye Terrier that was bred for a beautiful long silky coat, also figured into the early dogs. Some authorities believed that the Maltese was used as well. "They were all originally bred from Scotch Terriers (meaning dogs from Scotland, not today's Scottish Terrier) and shown as such the name Yorkshire Terrier was given to them on account of their being improved so much in Yorkshire." Yorkshire Terriers were shown in a dog show category (class) at the time called "Rough and Broken-coated, Broken-haired Scotch and Yorkshire Terriers". Hugh Dalziel, writing in 1878, says that "the classification of these dogs at shows and in the Kennel Club Stud Book is confusing and absurd" in lumping together these different types.

In the early days of the breed, "almost anything in the shape of a Terrier having a long coat with blue on the body and fawn or silver coloured head and legs, with tail docked and ears trimmed, was received and admired as a Yorkshire Terrier". But in the late 1860s, a popular Paisley-type Yorkshire Terrier show dog named Huddersfield Ben, owned by a woman living in Yorkshire, Mary Ann Foster, was seen at dog shows throughout Great Britain, and defined the breed type for the Yorkshire Terrier.

Huddersfield Ben

Huddersfield Ben was a Yorkshire Terrier whose portrait was painted by George Earl and in 1891 an authority on the breed wrote, "Huddersfield Ben was the best stud dog of his breed during his lifetime, and one of the most remarkable dogs of any pet breed that ever lived; and most of the show specimens of the present day have one or more crosses of his blood in their pedigree." A show winner, Huddersfield Ben, through his puppies, helped define the Yorkshire Terrier breed. He is still referred to as "father of the breed."

In North America
The Yorkshire Terrier was introduced in North America in 1872 and the first Yorkshire Terrier was registered with the American Kennel Club (AKC) in 1885. During the Victorian era, the Yorkshire Terrier was a popular pet, and show dog in England, and as Americans embraced Victorian customs, so too did they embrace the Yorkshire Terrier. The breed's popularity dipped in the 1940s, when the percentage of small breed dogs registered fell to an all-time low of 18% of total registrations. Smoky, a Yorkshire Terrier and famous war dog from World War II, is credited with beginning a renewal of interest in the breed. The AKC ranked the Yorkshire Terrier as the 6th most popular purebred in the United States in 2012 and 2013.

Coat
For adult Yorkshire Terriers, The American Kennel Club places importance on coat colour, quality, and texture. According to The Kennel Club (UK), the hair must be glossy, fine, straight, and silky. Traditionally the coat is grown out very long and is parted down the middle of the back, but "must never impede movement.". The hair of the Yorkshire Terrier can be used to determine content of metals in the dog organism.
 
From the back of the neck to the base of the tail, the coat should be a dark grey to a black colour, and the hair on the tail should be a darker black. On the head, high chest and legs, the hair should be a bright, rich tan, darker at the roots than in the middle, that shades into a lighter tan at the tips, but not for all dogs. Also, in adult dogs there should be no black hairs intermingled with any of the tan-coloured fur. The fine, straight, silky coat is considered hypoallergenic.

Adult Yorkshire Terriers whose coat colours deviate from the standard, or that have woolly or extra fine coats, are still Yorkshire Terriers. The only difference is that it is not recommended to intentionally breed atypical Yorkshire Terriers. In addition, care may be more difficult for "woolly" or "cottony" textured coats, or coats that are overly fine. One of the reasons given for not breeding "off-coloured" Yorkies is that the colour could be a potential indicator of a genetic defect that may affect the dog's health; a careful health screening can clarify if any health risks exist. Coats may vary in colour. For example, a mature Yorkie may have a silver-blue with light brown, while another might have a black and creamy colour.

The long coat on the Yorkshire Terrier requires regular brushing.

Hypoallergenic coats

The typical fine, straight, and silky Yorkshire Terrier coat has also been listed by many popular dog information websites as being hypoallergenic. In comparison with many other breeds, Yorkies do not shed to the same degree, losing small amounts when bathed or brushed.  The dog's dander and saliva typically trigger allergic reactions. Allergists recognise that at times a particular allergy patient will be able to tolerate a particular dog, but they agree that "the luck of the few with their pets cannot be stretched to fit all allergic people and entire breeds of dogs." The Yorkshire Terrier coat is said to fall out only when brushed or broken, or just said to not shed. Although neither of those statements agree with what biologists, veterinarians, and allergists know about dog fur, allergists "think there really are differences in protein production between dogs that may help one patient and not another".

Other colours

The Yorkshire Terrier is a tan dog with a blue saddle. Particolours exist, although they are not correct for the breed standard. The particolour coat is white with black-blue and tan. The white is caused by the recessive piebald gene. It is very rare to get a particolour, and if one is found, it tends to be very expensive. Some Yorkshire Terriers are solid golden, they only produce pheomelanin, others are liver or chocolate, a brown colour; they produce brown eumelanin instead of black eumelanin. The standard prescribes clearly defined fur-colours, and non-standard colours may indicate crossbreeding with other breeds or in rare cases even health problems. The AKC registration form for Yorkshire Terriers allows for four choices: blue and tan, blue and gold, black and tan, black and gold. Colour alone will not affect whether or not a dog is a good companion and pet. Even though off-coloured Yorkshire Terriers are advertised at premium prices, being of an unusual or atypical colour is stated to be neither new, desirable, nor exotic.

Mismatched Yorkshire Terriers should not be crossed with Biewer Terriers, a new breed that originated in Germany. Although the AKC will not deny registration of a Yorkshire Terrier on colour alone, meaning that particolours are now registerable with the AKC, the Yorkshire Terrier Club of America has a directive that "any solid colour or combination of colours other than black and tan" for adult dogs is a disqualification, and "dogs of solid colour, unusual combination of colours, and particolours should be disqualified."

Puppy coats

It may take three or more years for the coat to reach its final colour. The final colour is usually a black or greyish colour. P. H. Combs, writing in 1891, complained about show wins awarded to puppies, when the dog's coat does not fully come in until three or four years old, "and the honour of winning such a prize (for a puppy) can therefore be of but little practical benefit to the owner" since the adult dog's colour cannot be exactly predicted.

Coat care 

Owners may trim the hair short for easier care. For shows, the coat is left long, and may be trimmed to floor length to give ease of movement and a neater appearance. Hair on the feet and the tips of ears can also be trimmed. The traditional long coat is extremely high maintenance. The coat might get knotted if not brushed daily. In order to prevent breakage, the coat may be wrapped in rice paper, tissue paper or plastic, after a light oiling with a coat oil. The oil has to be washed out once a month and the wraps must be fixed periodically during the week to prevent them from sliding down and breaking the hair. Elaborate coat care dates from the earliest days of the breed. In 1878, John Walsh described similar preparations: the coat is "well greased" with coconut oil, the dog is bathed weekly, and the dog's feet are "carefully kept in stockings".

Temperament

The ideal Yorkshire Terrier character or "personality" has been described by the Kennel Club as having a "carriage very upright feisty" and "conveying an important air". Though small, the Yorkshire Terrier is active, very protective, curious, and fond of attention. Yorkshire Terriers are easy going dogs that are great with children and older adults. If trained correctly, these dogs are very child friendly, easy going, and like to be played with.

Yorkshire Terriers are an easy dog breed to train. This results from their own nature to work without human assistance. They are naturally smart and quick to learn with many being food and/or praise motivated.  Because they were developed as a working breed, many need a lot of both physical and mental stimulation—with both long walks/runs but also indoor games and training to keep their mind busy. They are known for being yappy, but many have reported that a contented Yorkie is a quiet one—that will happily curl up on your knee in the evening. But they are all individuals, with some being much more laid back than others, and the breeder should ideally be able to advise on the needs and temperaments of their particular line. Yorkies are easily adaptable to all surroundings, travel well, and make suitable pets for many homes. Due to their small size, they require limited exercise but need daily interaction with people. They thrive on attention and love. Many are more timid around other dogs and prefer to stay close to their humans for comfort.

Yorkshire Terriers do tend to bark a lot. This makes them excellent watchdogs, as they will sound the alarm when anyone gets close. A barking problem can often be resolved with proper training and exercise.

Yorkshire Terriers are ranked 34th in Stanley Coren's The Intelligence of Dogs.

Health
Health issues often seen in the Yorkshire Terrier include bronchitis, lymphangiectasia, portosystemic shunt, cataracts, and keratitis sicca. Additionally, Yorkies often have a delicate digestive system, with vomiting or diarrhoea resulting from consumption of foods outside of a regular diet. The relatively small size of the Yorkshire Terrier means that it usually has a poor tolerance for anaesthesia. Additionally, a toy dog such as the Yorkie is more likely to be injured by falls, other dogs, and owner clumsiness. Injection reactions (inflammation or hair loss at the site of an injection) can occur. In addition, allergies can cause skin to be dry, itchy and/or red.

The lifespan of a Yorkie is 13–20 years. Undersized Yorkies (under ) generally have a shorter life span, as they are especially prone to health problems such as chronic diarrhoea and vomiting; are more sensitive to anaesthesia; and are more easily injured.

Teeth

As with all other dogs, Yorkies have two sets of teeth in their life. The first set of teeth is the 28-piece deciduous teeth (often referred to as "milk teeth", "baby teeth", or "puppy teeth"). The second set is the 42-piece permanent or adult teeth. Sometimes the number of permanent or adult teeth may vary, which is fine as long as they do not cause bad bite. When puppies are born, they have no teeth because milk is the only food they need. The deciduous teeth will grow from the age of 3 to 8 weeks old, in the order of incisors, canines, and premolars. Yorkie puppies have no molar teeth. Yorkie puppies will start to lose their deciduous or baby teeth when the permanent or adult teeth come in. The permanent or adult grow when the Yorkie puppies are 4 to 8 months old. By around 8 months old, those teeth should fully develop. The permanent or adult teeth will grow in the order of incisors, canines, premolars, and molars. Molar teeth will develop at around 6 to 8 months old.

Yorkies and other small dog breeds may have problems if the deciduous or baby teeth do not fall out as the permanent or adult teeth grow. This is caused by the new teeth not growing right underneath the deciduous teeth. (Usually, a puppy's body will absorb the roots of puppy teeth.) If the puppy tooth does not yield to the incoming tooth, it should be removed because it can cause a malocclusion or bad bite.  Retained teeth can cause tooth decay because food can be easily caught in between the deciduous and permanent teeth. Sometimes the new teeth are forced to grow into an abnormal position and further cause a bad bite. The retained teeth may stay or fall weeks after the new teeth have developed. When necessary, the retained deciduous or baby teeth need to be removed surgically.

Like other small breeds, Yorkies are also prone to severe dental disease. Because they have a small jaw, their teeth can become crowded and may not fall out naturally. This can cause food and plaque to build up, and bacteria can eventually develop on the surface of the teeth, leading to periodontal disease. In addition, the bacteria can spread to other parts of the body and cause heart and kidney problems. The best prevention is regular brushing of the teeth with a toothpaste formulated specifically for dogs. Human toothpaste is not recommended, because it foams more easily and may be swallowed. Professional teeth cleaning by a veterinarian may also be required to prevent the development of dental problems.

Genetic defects
Certain genetic disorders can be found in Yorkshire Terriers, including distichiasis, hydrocephalus, hypoplasia of dens, Legg–Calvé–Perthes syndrome, luxating patella, portosystemic shunt, retinal dysplasia, tracheal collapse, and bladder stones.  The following are among the most common congenital defects that affect Yorkies:

 Distichiae, eyelashes arising from an abnormal spot (usually the duct of the meibomian gland at the edge of the eyelid), are often found in Yorkies.  Distichiae can irritate the eye and cause tearing, squinting, inflammation, corneal abrasions or corneal ulcers, and scarring. Treatment options may include manual removal, electrolysis, or surgery.
 Hypoplasia of dens is a non-formation of the pivot point of the second cervical vertebra, which leads to spinal cord damage.  Onset of the condition may occur at any age, producing signs ranging from neck pain to quadriplegia.
 Legg–Calvé–Perthes syndrome, which causes the top of the femur (thigh bone) to degenerate, occurs in Yorkies in certain lines.  The condition appears to result from insufficient circulation to the area around the hip joint. As the blood supply is reduced, the bone in the head of the femur collapses and dies and the cartilage coating around it becomes cracked and deformed.  Usually the disease appears when the Yorkie is young (between five and eight months of age); signs are pain, limping or lameness.  The standard treatment is surgery to remove the affected part of the bone.  Following surgery, muscles hold the femur in place and fibrous tissue forms in the area of removal to prevent bone rubbing on bone.  Although the affected leg will be slightly shorter than prior to surgery, the Yorkie may regain almost normal use.
 Luxating patellas (slipping kneecaps) are another common defect considered to be genetic in Yorkies, although it may also be caused by an accidental fall. Weak ligaments and tendons in the knee or malformed (too shallow) patellar grooves, allow the patella to slip out of its groove sideways. This causes the leg to 'lock up' with the foot held off the ground. A dog with this problem may experience frequent pain and lameness, or may be bothered by it only on occasion. Over time, the patellar ridges can become worn down, making the groove even more shallow and causing the dog to become increasingly lame.  Surgery is the main treatment option available for luxating patellas, although it is not necessary for every dog with the condition. The severity of luxating patellas are on a scale of 1 to 4, with 4 being the most severe. Many dogs will not develop past a stage 1 or 2.
 Portosystemic shunt, a congenital malformation of the portal vein (which brings blood to the liver for cleansing), is also common in Yorkies. In this condition some of the dog's blood bypasses the liver and the "dirty" blood goes on to poison the heart, brain, lungs and other organs with toxins. A Yorkie with this condition might exhibit a wide variety of symptoms, such as small stature, poor appetite, weak muscle development, decreased ability to learn, inferior coordination, occasional vomiting and diarrhoea, behavioral abnormalities, seizures (especially after a meal) and blindness, which could lead to a coma and death. Often, the shunt can be treated with surgery.

Tracheal collapse, caused by a progressive weakening of the walls of the trachea, occurs in many toy breeds, especially very tiny Yorkies.  As a result of genetics, the walls of the trachea can be flaccid, a condition that becomes more severe with age. Cushing's syndrome, a disorder that causes production of excess steroid hormone by the adrenal glands, can also weaken cartilage and lead to tracheal collapse.  There is a possibility that physical strain on the neck might cause or contribute to trachea collapse. Since this is usually caused by an energetic Yorkie pulling against his collar, many veterinarians recommend use of a harness for leashed walks.  An occasional "goose honking" cough, especially on exertion or excitement, is usually the first sign of this condition.  Over time, the cough may become almost constant in the Yorkie's later life. Breathing through the obstruction of a collapsed (or partially collapsed) trachea for many years can result in complications, including chronic lung disease. The coughing can be countered with cough suppressants and bronchodilators.  If the collapse is advanced and unresponsive to medication, sometimes surgery can repair the trachea.

Hypoglycaemia
Low blood sugar in puppies, or transient juvenile hypoglycaemia, is caused by fasting (too much time between meals).  In rare cases, hypoglycaemia may continue to be a problem in mature, usually very small, Yorkies. It is often seen in Yorkie puppies at 5 to 16 weeks of age.  Very tiny Yorkie puppies are especially predisposed to hypoglycaemia because a lack of muscle mass makes it difficult to store glucose and regulate blood sugar. Factors such as stress, fatigue, a cold environment, poor nutrition, and a change in diet or feeding schedule may bring on hypoglycaemia. Low blood sugar can also be the result of a bacterial infection, parasite or portosystemic liver shunt. Hypoglycaemia causes the puppy to become drowsy, listless (glassy-eyed), shaky, uncpoglycaemic attack, the puppy usually has very pale or grey gums. The puppy also may not eat unless force-fed. Hypoglycaemia and dehydration seem to go hand-in-hand, and force-feeding or injecting fluids may also be necessary. Additionally, a hypoglycaemic Yorkie may have a lower than normal body temperature and, in extreme cases, may have a seizure or go into a coma. A dog showing symptoms should be given sugar in the form of corn syrup or Nutri-Cal and be treated by a veterinarian immediately, as prolonged or recurring attacks of hypoglycaemia can permanently damage the dog's brain. In severe cases, it can be fatal.

Docking and Cropping

Traditionally, the Yorkshire Terrier's tail is docked to a medium length.   Opposition to this practice began very early in the history of the breed; Hugh Dalziel, writing about Yorkshire Terriers in 1878, declared that "There is no reason for mutilating pet dogs, and perfect ears and tails should be bred, not clipped into shape with scissors." AKC and Canadian Kennel Club still require the Yorkie's tail be docked in order to compete at its events. The majority of the rest of the world has adopted a "no docking/no cropping" rule. Often, a Yorkshire Terrier's dewclaws, if any, are removed in the first few days of life, another controversial practice.

Similar breeds and crosses
The Yorkshire Terrier breed descends from larger but similar Scottish breeds, such as the Skye Terrier and the now-extinct Paisley Terrier. In its turn, other breeds have been created from the Yorkshire Terrier, such as the Silky Terrier. Demand for unusual pets has resulted in high prices being paid for Yorkshire Terriers crossed with various other breeds, which are described with a portmanteau word made up of syllables (or sounds) from Yorkshire Terrier and the breed name of the other parent. Some of these such portmanteau-named crosses can be found on the list of dog crossbreeds.

Two other breeds that look similar to the Yorkshire Terrier and have shorter hair are the prick-eared Norwich Terrier, along with its drop-eared relative the Norfolk Terrier. Another is the Biewer Terrier, which derives from the Yorkshire Terrier. The Biewer Terrier, bred from blue, white and gold puppies named Schneeflocke and Schneeflöckchen von Friedheck, owned by Mr. and Mrs. Biewer in Germany, was once considered a variation of the Yorkshire Terrier but has since been recognised as a separate breed by many kennel clubs, including the AKC.

Notability

Show dogs

 In 1997, Champion Ozmilion Mystification became the first Yorkie to win Best in Show at Crufts, the world's largest annual dog show.

Small dogs
 Sylvia, a matchbox-sized Yorkshire Terrier owned by Arthur Marples of Blackburn, England, was the smallest dog in recorded history.

War dogs
 Smoky, a war dog and hero of World War II, was owned by William Wynne of Cleveland, Ohio. Wynne adopted Smoky while he was serving with the 5th Air Force in the Pacific.

White House dogs
 Pasha, Tricia Nixon Cox's pet Yorkie, lived in the White House during Richard Nixon's presidency.

References

FCI breeds
Terriers
Companion dogs
Dog breeds originating in England